Akinesis may refer to:
 Cranial akinesis, referring to skulls possessing no kinetic hinge
 Akinesia, the loss of the ability to create muscular movement in some diseases such as Parkinsons